The following outline is provided as an overview of and topical guide to society:

Society – group of people sharing the same geographical or virtual territory and therefore subject to the same political authority and dominant cultural expectations. Such people share a distinctive culture and institutions, which characterize the patterns of social relations between them. Large societies typically develop social stratification and dominance patterns among its subgroups. A given society may be described as the sum total of social relationships among its members. The branch of science that studies society is sociology.

What type of thing is a society?

A society can be described as all of the following:
 System
 Social system
 People
 Social group
 Community

Types of societies

 Humanity – the entire human race. As a whole, it can be viewed as one great big society.

In anthropology: by methods of subsistence

 Pre-industrial society
 Hunter-gatherer society
 Pastoral society
 Horticultural society
 Agrarian society
 Feudal society
 Industrial society
 Post-industrial society

In sociology and political science 
 by political structure:
 Band society
 Tribe
 Chiefdom
 Civilization
 State
 International community
 World community
 by modernity:
 Pre-modern
 Modern
 Post-modern

Aspects or features of societies

 Communities (outline) – while a society is a type of community, it can itself comprise smaller communities.
 Structure and agency
 Socialization
 Sense of community
 Communitarianism
 Social capital
 Community development
 Culture (outline) – Shared culture can create sub communities of people within a society due to their shared attitudes, values, goals and practices (ref: Woodward, K., (2004) Questioning Identity: gender, class, ethnicity, Milton Keynes, The Open University).
 Cultural heritage
 Economy (outline)
 Economic system
 Education (outline)
 Government
 Identity – Interaction with others within our society helps shape our identity (along with our gender, class & cultural origins), and a shared society can promote a sense of shared identity (ref: Woodward, K., (2004) Questioning Identity: gender, class, ethnicity, Milton Keynes, The Open University).
 Infrastructure – see Infrastructure section, below
 Institutions – see Social institutions section, below
 Land
 Natural resources
 People
 Politics (outline)
 Social control
 Guilt society
 Shame society
 Social structure
 Social order
 Social stratification
 Technology and society (outline)
 Wealth

Infrastructure 

Infrastructure
 Public infrastructure
 Transportation systems
 Road systems
 Roads
 Highways
 Streets
 Bridges
 Tunnels
 Mass transit
 Airports and Airways 
 Water supply and Water resources
 Wastewater management
 Solid-waste treatment and disposal
 Electric power
 Private infrastructure
 Personal property
 Automobiles
 Personal computers
 Real estate
 Homes

Social institutions 

Social institution – Any persistent structure or mechanism of social order governing the behaviour of a set of individuals within a given community. The term "institution" is commonly applied to customs and behavior patterns important to a society, as well as to particular formal organizations of government and public services.
 Family
 Family members – families are composed of:
 Offspring
 Daughter
 Son
 Parent
 Father
 Mother
 Grandparent
 Types of families
 Nuclear family
 Extended family
 Family related topics
 Home
 Human bonding
 Sociology of the family
 Government
 Marriage and the family
 Religion (outline) and religious institutions – see sociology of religion; civil religion
 Educational institutions – schools (preschool, primary/elementary, secondary, and post-secondary/higher – see Sociology of education)
 Research community – Academia and universities; research institutes – see sociology of science
 Medicine – hospitals and other health care institutions – see sociology of health and illness, medical sociology
 Psychiatric hospitals (history)
 Law (outline)  and legal system – courts; judges; the legal profession (bar) – see jurisprudence, philosophy of law, sociology of law
 Law enforcement and society
 Criminal justice or penal systems – prisons – see sociology of punishment
 Military (outline) – (See also military sociology).
 Paramilitary
 Police forces
 Mass media – including the news media (television, newspapers) and the popular media – see media studies
 Industry – businesses, including corporations – see financial institution, factory, capitalism, division of labour, social class, industrial sociology
 Civil society or NGOs – Charitable organizations; advocacy groups; political parties; think tanks; virtual communities

Societal change

 Social change
 Decadence
 Social development
 Social progress
 Technological evolution
 Sociocultural evolution

Stages of sociocultural evolution 

Sociocultural evolution – below are listed some typical and some potential stages of progression in the evolution of cultures and societies:
 Pre-civilization
 Hunter-gatherer bands
 Social rank
 Tribes
 Social stratification
 Chiefdoms
 Neolithic Revolution
 Civilization
 Pre-industrial society
 Agrarian society
 Agrarian villages
 Towns
 Cities
 City-states
 Nation-states
 Industrial Revolution
 Modernity
 Industrial society
 Postmodernity
 Post-industrial society
 Informational Revolution
 Information society
 Digital Revolution
 Knowledge society
 Globalization – process by which the world is becoming more interconnected, being integrated into a unified global community, through the interchange — of world views, products, ideas and other aspects of culture — made possible by technological advancements in communication and transportation and the dissemination of knowledge those bring.
 World government? – notion of a single common political authority (global state) for all of humanity. Currently there is no worldwide executive, legislature, judiciary, military, or constitution with jurisdiction over the entire planet. The United Nations is limited to a mostly advisory role, and its stated purpose is to foster cooperation between existing national governments rather than exert authority over them.
 Space colonization? – hypothetical expansion of the human race into outer space: to the moon, to other planets or moons, or in space stations.
 Technological singularity? (TS) – hypothetical result that may occur if and when strong AI (artificial intelligence at least as smart as a human) is developed. Such AIs would be recursive, and therefore able to improve themselves (or each other) at an increasingly rapid rate to super intelligence. Technological advancements implemented by such entities would probably be so profound and come so quickly that it seems unlikely anyone could reliably forecast what such a future would be like — like a black hole, a singularity we cannot see.

Forces of societal change
 Connections – James Burke presented in this TV series his hypothesis that the entire gestalt of the modern world is the result of a web of interconnected events, each one consisting of a person or group acting for reasons of their own motivations (e.g., profit, curiosity, religious) with no concept of the final, modern result to which the actions of either them or their contemporaries would lead. The interplay of the results of these isolated events is what drives history and innovation.
 Conquest
 Cooperation
 Deviance
 Disaster
 Economic forces
 Economic growth
 Exploration
 Human migration – Migration can impact on our identity since it may be difficult to feel a sense of belonging in a new society. Human migration can also introduce new cultural values to a society (ref: Held, D., (2004) A globalizing world? Culture, economics and politics, London Routeledge/The Open University).
 Population change
 Population decline
 Population growth
 Revolution
 Social conflict
 Social disintegration
 Social movement
 Societal collapse
 Technological change
 Urbanization
 Trade
 War

History of society

 History of civilization
 Society-related history
 Rural history
 Social history
 Urban history
 Sociocultural evolution

Study of society: sociology

Outline of sociology
 Sociology – Scientific study of society. This social science directs methods of empirical investigation and critical analysis upon human social activity, focusing on the influence of relationships and how they affect attitudes and behaviours. Sociologists conduct research to refine the theoretical understanding of social processes, or for application to social policy and welfare.
 Branches of sociology
 History of sociology

See also

 Outline of community

 Place these
Ethnic groups •
Social institutions – Organization
Social network – Communication • Journalism • Social capital

References

External links

 
 Definition of Society from the Merriam-Webster Dictionary.
 Lecture notes on "Defining Society" from East Carolina University.
 Cliff Notes on Types of Societies
 Industrial revolution
 Internet Modern History Sourcebook: Industrial Revolution
 "The Day the World Took Off" Six part video series from the University of Cambridge tracing the question "Why did the Industrial Revolution begin when and where it did."
 BBC History Home Page: Industrial Revolution
 National Museum of Science and Industry website: machines and personalities
 Industrial Revolution and the Standard of Living by Clark Nardinelli - the debate over whether standards of living rose or fell.

 Society, Outline
 
Society